Cylicasta is a genus of longhorn beetles of the subfamily Lamiinae, containing the following species:

 Cylicasta difficilis (Lameere, 1893)
 Cylicasta liturata (Fabricius, 1801)
 Cylicasta nysa Dillon & Dillon, 1946
 Cylicasta parallela (Melzer, 1934)
 Cylicasta terminata (Buquet, 1859)

References

Onciderini